Cedar Manor, originally named Power Place was a railroad station along the Atlantic Branch of the Long Island Rail Road, in Queens, New York City. The station opened as a small one-story frame station here in 1906, east of the track and north of what was then called Power Place, which was later renamed 114th Avenue, and finally renamed Linden Boulevard. Cedar Manor was a real estate development covering the neighborhood generally west and north of the crossing of the LIRR with New York Boulevard. Before World War I it was a signal stop only. The station was phased out on January 28, 1959 and the building was razed in February 1959 with grade elimination, and was discontinued as a station stop.

References

Former Long Island Rail Road stations in New York City
Railway stations in the United States opened in 1906
1906 establishments in New York City
Railway stations closed in 1959
1959 disestablishments in New York (state)
Jamaica, Queens